UWN may refer to:

University World News
United Wrestling Network
University of Wales, Newport